The Copa Fraternidad 1973 was the third Central American club championship played between 6 clubs.

Teams

Results

Standings

Championship playoff

Champion

External links
RSSSF - Copa Fraternidad

1973
1
1972–73 in Costa Rican football
1972–73 in Salvadoran football
1972–73 in Guatemalan football